Euphorbia tannensis var. eremophila is the more widespread variety of E. tannensis subsp. eremophila (Desert Spurge).

Description
It grows as an erect shrub, usually up to a metre in height, but sometimes up to 1.5 metres, with green or yellow flowers. From a distance it may appear leafless. It is distinguished from the other variety, E. tannensis var. finlaysonii, by its ovate involucral glands.

Taxonomy
This taxon was first published by Allan Cunningham in 1848, at species rank as Euphorbia eremophila. In 1977 David Hassall demoted it to a variety of E. tannensis. At the same time he did the same thing for E. finlaysonii, and since he felt these two to be more closely related to each other than either is to the type material of E. tannensis, he erected E. tannensis subsp. eremophila to hold both varieties.

Distribution and habitat
This variety is widespread on the Australian mainland, occurring in every mainland state, though only in the far north-west corner of Victoria.

References

tannensis var. eremophila
Malpighiales of Australia
Rosids of Western Australia
Flora of South Australia
Flora of the Northern Territory
Flora of Queensland
Flora of New South Wales
Flora of Victoria (Australia)